"Deja Vu" is a song by American rapper and singer Post Malone, featuring vocals from Canadian singer Justin Bieber. It was released through Republic Records as the fourth single from Malone's debut studio album, Stoney, on September 9, 2016. Malone and Bieber wrote the song with producers Frank Dukes and Vinylz alongside Matthew Tavares, Kaan Güneşberk, FKi 1st, Louis Bell, Carl Rosen, and Julkeyz. It marks the first collaboration between the two artists.

Background
Before collaborating, Malone opened for Bieber on the Purpose World Tour, to support Bieber's fourth studio album, Purpose (2015), which led to the two artists developing a friendship. Malone was halfway through recording Stoney producer Frank Dukes played him an unfinished instrumental that he had come up with. In January 2016, Bieber visited Malone in the studio, in which he heard the beat and wanted to get on the song. Bieber immediately took to the beat and ended up recording his vocals, what would become the finished version of "Deja Vu" in the booth, with him and Malone going back and forth with ideas. After Bieber finished, Malone put the song together with the help of Bell and the others who were involved. Bell referred to the session as a high-pressure situation that "kept [him] on [his] toes" while he engineered and recorded the track. "Deja Vu" leaked online a day before its official release.

Composition and lyrics
"Deja Vu" is a laid-back pop song with a deep R&B groove involving "wistful, detuned guitar riffs". It opens with a church organ that backs the track. Several critics made comparisons to Drake's "Hotline Bling" in regards to the song's sound. In particular, The Faders David Renshaw said it "has an almost 'Hotline Bling'-esque tempo", while Madeline Roth of MTV News, Danny Schwartz of HotNewHipHop, and Billboards Colin Stutz noted similarities between the two with the song's start. In a different comparison, Dana Getz of Entertainment Weekly wrote that it "features a slow fizz, cha-cha inflected beat akin to a drowsier take on Drake's 'One Dance.

"Deja Vu" is about an on-and-off-again love where "Malone helms sluggish, lovesick verses". An echoed coo accompanies Malone and Bieber as they sing the hook, with the latter repeating before delivering his verse: "Tell me is that deja vu? / 'Cause you want me and I want you."

Credits and personnel

 Post Malone – lead vocals, songwriting
 Justin Bieber – featured vocals, songwriting
 Frank Dukes – production, songwriting, programming, percussion
 Vinylz – production, songwriting
 Matthew Tavares – songwriting, guitar, bass guitar, keyboards
 Kaan Güneşberk – songwriting, background vocals
 FKi 1st – songwriting
 Louis Bell – songwriting
 Carl Rosen – songwriting
 Julkeyz – songwriting
 Manny Marroquin – mixing
 Louis Bell – recording
 Alex Pavone – other contributions

Charts

Certifications

Release history

References

External links
Lyrics of this song at Genius

2016 singles
2016 songs
Republic Records singles
Post Malone songs
Justin Bieber songs
Songs written by Frank Dukes
Song recordings produced by Vinylz
Songs written by Vinylz
Songs written by Post Malone
Songs written by Louis Bell
Songs written by Justin Bieber
Song recordings produced by Frank Dukes
Songs written by Matthew Tavares